Squadron 107 is a squadron of the Israeli Air Force. 

Squadron 107 is also known as the Knights of the Orange Tail. It  was formed in January 1953 to operate Supermarine Spitfires out of Ramat David Airbase.  Although it was disbanded a year later, it was reformed in the 1960s and currently operates the F-16I Sufa out of Hatzerim Airbase.

References

External links
Global Security Profile
 
Israeli Air Force squadrons
Military units and formations established in 1953
Military units and formations disestablished in 1954
Military units and formations established in 1960